The 1575 Valdivia earthquake occurred at 14:30 local time on December 16. It had an estimated magnitude of 8.5 of on the surface wave magnitude scale and an estimated magnitude of 9.0+  on the Moment magnitude scale and led to the flood of Valdivia, Chile.

Pedro Mariño de Lobera, who was corregidor of Valdivia by that time, wrote that the waters of the river opened like the Red Sea, one part flowing upstream and one downstream. Mariño de Lobera also evacuated the city until the dam at Laguna de Anigua (nowadays Riñihue Lake) burst. At that moment he wrote that, while many Native people died, no Spaniards did, as the settlement of Valdivia was moved temporarily away from the riverside.

The effects of this earthquake are similar to the 1960 Valdivia earthquake, the largest ever recorded on earth, which also caused ensuing Riñihuazo flooding.  These similarities show that large earthquakes have a pattern that span over several centuries.

See also
List of earthquakes in Chile
List of historical earthquakes

References

External links
Epicenter of 1575 Valdivia earthquake | earthquake epicenter- wikimapia.com

1575 Valdivia earthquake
16th-century earthquakes
1575 in the Captaincy General of Chile
1575 Valdivia earthquake
1575 in science
1570s in the Viceroyalty of Peru